Beaumesnil is a commune in the Calvados department in the Normandy region in northwestern France.

Geography
The village is centred on a staggered crossroads between the D52 which heads to Pont-Farcy to the north and Vire to the south and the D81 which leads to Le Beny-Bocage to the north east and Landelles-et-Coupigny to the south west.

Population

See also
Communes of the Calvados department

References

Communes of Calvados (department)
Calvados communes articles needing translation from French Wikipedia